Goniorhynchus gratalis is a moth in the family Crambidae. It was described by Julius Lederer in 1863. It is found in Indonesia (Ambon Island, Java), north-eastern India, Burma

References

Moths described in 1863
Spilomelinae